Sing a Song of Six Pants is a 1947 short subject directed by Jules White starring American slapstick comedy team The Three Stooges (Moe Howard, Larry Fine and Shemp Howard). It is the 102nd entry in the series released by Columbia Pictures starring the comedians, who released 190 shorts for the studio between 1934 and 1959.

Plot 
The Stooges run a tailor shop that is about to be repossessed by the Skin and Flint Finance Corporation. When the Boys hear about a big reward for fugitive bank robber Terry "Slippery Fingered" Hargan (Harold Brauer), they think that catching him might end their financial woes. Hargan conveniently ducks into their shop as the officer (Vernon Dent) enters and leaves a suit with a safe combination in its pocket. After his girlfriend (Virginia Hunter) fails to retrieve the combination, Hargan returns with his henchmen, and a wild mêlée follows. The Stooges miss out on the reward but wind up with the crook's bankroll to pay off their debts.

Cast

Credited
 Moe Howard as Moe
 Larry Fine as Larry
 Shemp Howard as Shemp
 Vernon Dent as Detective 
 Harold Brauer as Terry Hargan
 Virginia Hunter as Hargan's Girlfriend

Uncredited
 Cy Schindell as Henchman
 Bing Connolly as Henchman
 Phil Arnold as Customer with shredded jacket
 Jules White as the voice of the radio announcer

Production notes

Sing a Song of Six Pants was filmed on April 1–4, 1947. The title is a takeoff on "Sing a Song of Sixpence," the classic English nursery rhyme. The name of the tailor shop is "Pip Boys," a parody of the auto service chain Pep Boys originally opened in Philadelphia in 1921. Sing a Song of Six Pants was remade in 1953 as Rip, Sew and Stitch, using ample recycled footage from the original.

There is an audio goof in the film during a scene when Moe is making pancakes on the pants press; director Jules White can be heard saying "Cut!" right as the camera fades into the next scene.

Copyright status

Sing a Song of Six Pants is one of four Columbia Stooge shorts that fell into the public domain after their copyright expired in the 1960s, the other three being Malice in the Palace (1949), Brideless Groom (1947), and Disorder in the Court (1936). As such, these four shorts frequently appear on budget VHS and DVD compilations.

See also
 Public domain film
 List of American films of 1947
 List of films in the public domain in the United States

References

External links 
 
 
 

1947 films
1947 comedy films
American black-and-white films
1940s English-language films
Films directed by Jules White
The Three Stooges films
Columbia Pictures short films
American comedy short films
1940s American films